Nelson Lake is a dry lake in the Mojave Desert of San Bernardino County, California,  northeast of Barstow.

Nelson Lake is on federal lands within the borders of the Fort Irwin Military Reservation, southwest of the Granite Mountains.

See also
 List of lakes in California

External links
 
 Satellite Photo (Google Maps)

Lakes of the Mojave Desert
Lakes of San Bernardino County, California
Endorheic lakes of California
Lakes of California
Lakes of Southern California